The 2020 United States House of Representatives elections in Florida was held on November 3, 2020, to elect the 27 U.S. representatives from Florida, one from each of the state's 27 congressional districts. The elections coincided with the 2020 U.S. presidential election, as well as other elections to the House of Representatives, elections to the U.S. Senate, and various state and local elections.

In what was considered an upset, the Republican Party retook the two seats that it lost to the Democrats in 2018, expanding its 14–13 majority to 16–11.

Statewide

District 1

The 1st district encompasses the western Panhandle, and includes all of Escambia, Okaloosa, Santa Rosa, and Walton counties, as well as part of Holmes County. The district includes the cities of Pensacola, Fort Walton Beach, and Navarre. Republican Matt Gaetz, who has represented the district since 2017, was re-elected with 67% of the vote in 2018.

Republican primary

Candidates

Nominee
Matt Gaetz, incumbent U.S. representative

Eliminated in primary
Greg Merk, retired United States Air Force officer
John Mills, retired United States Navy pilot and candidate for Florida's 1st congressional district in 2016 and 2018

Primary results

Democratic primary

Candidates

Nominee
Phil Ehr, retired United States Navy commander and candidate for Florida's 1st congressional district in 2018

Independent and third-party candidates

Independents

Declared 
 Albert Oram, lawyer

General election

Predictions

Results

District 2

The 2nd district is located in northern Florida taking in portions of the Panhandle and the Big Bend, including all or parts of 19 counties. The district includes the cities of Panama City, Marianna, and Lake City. Republican Neal Dunn, who has represented the district since 2017, was re-elected with 67% of the vote in 2018.

Republican primary

Candidates

Declared
Neal Dunn, incumbent U.S. representative

Democratic primary

Candidates

Withdrawn
Willie Anderson, priest
Connor Oswald, teacher
Kristy Thripp, activist

Independent and third-party candidates

Independents

Declared 
 Kim O'Connor (write-in), candidate for Leon County commission in 2018

General election

Predictions

Results

District 3

The 3rd district is located in North Central Florida, and includes Alachua, Clay, Putnam, Bradford, and Union counties, as well as most of Marion County. The district includes the cities of Gainesville, Palatka, and Ocala. Republican Ted Yoho, who has represented the district since 2013, was re-elected with 57% of the vote in 2018. On December 10, 2019, Yoho announced he would not run for re-election, honoring his pledge that he would only serve 4 terms.

Republican primary

Candidates

Nominee
Kat Cammack, deputy chief of staff for U.S. representative Ted Yoho

Eliminated in primary
 Ryan Chamberlin, author
 Todd Chase, former Gainesville city commissioner
Bill Engelbrecht, healthcare executive
 Joe Millado, businessman and former congressional aide
Gavin Rollins, Clay County commissioner
 Judson Sapp, former actor and businessman
 James St. George, physician
David Theus, business consultant
 Amy Pope Wells, businesswoman

Withdrawn
Ed Braddy, former mayor of Gainesville
 Kent Guinn, mayor of Ocala

Declined
Rob Bradley, state senator
Keith Perry, state senator
Ted Yoho, incumbent U.S. representative

Endorsements

Polling

with Ted Yoho

Primary results

Democratic primary

Candidates

Nominee
 Adam Christensen, businessman

Eliminated in primary
 Philip Dodds, sales manager and candidate for Florida's 3rd congressional district in 2012
 Tom Wells, physicist

Endorsements

Primary results

General election

Predictions

Results

District 4

The 4th district is located in the First Coast region, and includes all of Nassau County, as well as parts of Duval and St. Johns counties. The district includes the cities of Jacksonville, St. Augustine, and Fernandina Beach. Republican John Rutherford, who has represented the district since 2017, was re-elected with 65% of the vote in 2018.

Republican primary

Candidates

Nominee
John Rutherford, incumbent U.S. representative

Eliminated in primary
 Erick Aguilar, professor and United States Navy veteran

Primary results

Democratic primary

Candidates

Nominee
Donna Deegan, former news anchor for First Coast News

Withdrawn
Monica DePaul, author

Endorsements

Independent and third-party candidates

Independents

Declared 
 Gary Koniz (write-in), retired journalist and perennial candidate

General election

Predictions

Polling

Results

District 5

The 5th district stretches along the northern border of Florida, and includes all of Baker, Gadsden, Hamilton and Madison counties, as well as parts of Columbia, Duval, Jefferson, and Leon counties. The district includes the city of Quincy, as well as parts of Tallahassee and Jacksonville. The district is majority-minority. Democrat Al Lawson, who has represented the district since 2017, was re-elected with 66% of the vote in 2018.

Democratic primary

Candidates

Nominee
Al Lawson, incumbent U.S. representative

Eliminated in primary
Albert Chester, pharmacist
LaShonda "LJ" Holloway, former congressional aide

Endorsements

Primary results

Republican primary

Candidates

Nominee
 Gary Adler, community activist

Eliminated in primary
Roger Wagoner, businessman

Primary results

General election

Predictions

Results

District 6

The 6th district encompasses the Halifax area, including all of Flagler and Volusia counties, as well as parts of St. Johns and Lake counties. The district includes the cities of Daytona Beach, Palm Coast, and DeLand. Republican Michael Waltz, who has represented the district since 2019, was elected with 56% of the vote in 2018.

Republican primary

Candidates

Nominee
 Michael Waltz, incumbent U.S. representative

Democratic primary

Candidates

Nominee
 Clint Curtis, lawyer and nominee for California's 4th congressional district in 2010

Eliminated in primary
Richard Thripp, professor

Primary results

Independent and third-party candidates

Independents

Declared
Gerry Nolan (write-in), businessman

Independent Democrats

Declared 

 Alan Grayson (write-in), former U.S. representative for Florida's 9th congressional district and candidate for U.S. Senate in 2016

General election

Predictions

Results

District 7

The 7th district is located in Central Florida, and includes all of Seminole County and part of Orange County. The district includes the cities of Orlando, Sanford, and Winter Park. Democrat Stephanie Murphy, who has represented the district since 2017, was re-elected with 57% of the vote in 2018.

This district was included on the list of Democratic-held seats the National Republican Congressional Committee targeted in 2020.

Democratic primary

Candidates

Nominee
 Stephanie Murphy, incumbent U.S. representative

Republican primary

Candidates

Nominee
 Leo Valentín, radiologist

Eliminated in primary
 Richard Goble, businessman
 Yukong Zhao, real estate investor

Withdrawn
Jan Edwards, businesswoman

Primary results

Independents and third-party candidates

Independents

Declared 
 William Garlington, businessman and former actor

General election

Predictions

Polling

with Richard Goble, Joel Greenberg (R), Stephanie Murphy and Leo Valentin

with Joel Greenberg and Stephanie Murphy

Results

District 8

The 8th district encompasses the Space Coast, and includes all of Indian River and Brevard counties, as well as part of Orange County. The district includes the cities of Melbourne, Palm Bay, and Titusville. Republican Bill Posey, who has represented the district since 2009, was re-elected with 60% of the vote in 2018.

Republican primary

Candidates

Nominee
 Bill Posey, incumbent U.S. representative

Eliminated in primary
 Scott Caine, retired U.S. Air Force colonel

Disqualified 

 Angela Walls-Windhauser, perennial candidate

Primary results

Democratic primary

Candidates

Nominee
 Jim Kennedy, electrical engineer

Withdrawn
Tiffany Patti, activist

Disqualified 

 Hicham Ammi, customer service manager
 Jason Williams, engineer

Endorsements

Independent and third-party candidates

Independents

Withdrawn 

 Russell Cyphers, former federal investigator for the departments of Treasury and Labor

General election

Predictions

Results

District 9

The 9th district is located in Central Florida, and encompasses all of Osceola County, as well as parts of Orange and Polk counties. The district includes the cities of Kissimmee and St. Cloud, as well as eastern Orlando. Democrat Darren Soto, who has represented the district since 2017, was re-elected with 58% of the vote in 2018.

Democratic primary

Candidates

Nominee
Darren Soto, incumbent U.S. representative

Withdrawn
 Hendrith Vanlon Smith Jr., financial advisor

Republican primary

Candidates

Nominee
Bill Olson, former U.S. Army sergeant

Eliminated in primary
Jose Castillo, hospitality manager
Sergio E. Ortiz, mortgage banker
Christopher Wright, attorney

Primary results

Independent and third-party candidates

Independents

Declared 

 Clay Hill (write-in), perennial candidate

Withdrawn 

 John Rallison, teacher and pastor

General election

Predictions

Results

District 10

The 10th district is located in Central Florida, and includes part of Orange County. The district includes western Orlando and its surrounding suburbs, including Apopka, Ocoee, and Winter Garden. Democrat Val Demings, who has represented the district since 2017, was re-elected unopposed in 2018.

Democratic primary

Candidates

Nominee
 Val Demings, incumbent U.S. representative

Republican primary

Candidates

Nominee
Vennia Francois, former U.S. Senate aide and candidate for Florida's 7th congressional district in 2018

Eliminated in primary
Willie Montague, pastor

Primary results

Independent and third-party candidates

Independents

Candidates 

 Sufiyah Yasmine (write-in), artist

Withdrawn 

 Kristofer Lawson, writer

General election

Predictions

Results

District 11

The 11th district is located in North Central Florida, and includes all of Sumter, Citrus, and Hernando counties, as well as parts of Marion and Lake counties. The district includes the cities of Spring Hill, Inverness, and Leesburg, as well as the large retirement community of The Villages. Republican Daniel Webster, who has represented the district since 2011, was re-elected with 65% of the vote in 2018.

Republican primary

Candidates

Nominee
 Daniel Webster, incumbent U.S. representative

Democratic primary

Candidates

Nominee
 Dana Cottrell, teacher and nominee for Florida's 11th congressional district in 2018

Withdrawn
Jeff Rabinowitz, author
James Henry, former official in Greenfield, Massachusetts and Hollis, Maine

General election

Predictions

Results

District 12

The 12th district encompasses the northern Tampa Bay area, including all of Pasco County, as well as parts of Hillsborough and Pinellas counties. The district includes the cities of Palm Harbor, New Port Richey, and Zephyrhills. Republican Gus Bilirakis, who has represented the district since 2007, was re-elected with 58% of the vote in 2018.

Republican primary

Candidates

Nominee
 Gus Bilirakis, incumbent U.S. representative

Democratic primary

Candidates

Nominee
 Kimberly Walker, businesswoman and U.S. Air Force veteran

Endorsements

Independent and third-party candidates

Independents

Withdrawn 

 Michael Knezevich, private investigator and former U.S. Customs Service pilot

General election

Predictions

Results

District 13

The 13th district is located in the western Tampa Bay area and encompasses the northern Florida Suncoast, and includes part of Pinellas County. The district includes the cities of St. Petersburg, Clearwater, and Largo. Democrat Charlie Crist, who has represented the district since 2017, was re-elected with 57% of the vote in 2018.

This district was included on the list of Democratic-held seats the National Republican Congressional Committee targeted in 2020.

Democratic primary

Candidates

Nominee
Charlie Crist, incumbent U.S. representative

Endorsements

Republican primary

Candidates

Nominee
Anna Paulina Luna, director of Hispanic Engagement for Turning Point USA and U.S. Air Force veteran

Eliminated in primary
George Buck, U.S. Army veteran and nominee for Florida's 13th congressional district in 2018
Sheila Griffin, attorney and candidate for St. Petersburg city council in 2015
Amanda Makki, lobbyist and former congressional aide

Withdrawn
Rick Baker, former mayor of St. Petersburg
Matt Becker, businessman and 2012 Republican National Convention executive
 Sharon Newby, businesswoman

Endorsements

Polling

Primary results

Independent and third-party candidates

Independent Republicans

Declared 

 Jacob Curnow (write-in), author

General election

Predictions

Polling

Results

District 14

The 14th district is located in the northern Tampa Bay area, and includes part of Hillsborough County. The district includes the cities of Tampa, Carrollwood, and Northdale. Democrat Kathy Castor, who has represented the district since 2007, was re-elected unopposed in 2018.

Democratic primary

Candidates

Nominee
 Kathy Castor, incumbent U.S. representative

Withdrawn 

 Alix Toulme Jr., Christian activist and U.S. Navy veteran

Republican primary

Candidates

Nominee
 Christine Quinn, businesswoman and nominee for Florida's 14th congressional district in 2016

Eliminated in primary
 Paul Elliott, former Hillsborough County judge

Primary results

Independent and third-party candidates

Independents

Withdrawn 

 Robert Wunderlich, attorney and former Green Beret

General election

Predictions

Results

District 15

The 15th district is located in the northeastern Tampa Bay area and extends along the I-4 corridor into Central Florida, and includes parts of Hillsborough, Polk, and Lake counties. The district includes the cities of Lakeland, Brandon, and Bartow. Republican Ross Spano, who has represented the district since 2019, was elected with 53% of the vote in 2018. Spano lost renomination in the Republican primary.

This district was included on the list of Republican-held seats the Democratic Congressional Campaign Committee targeted in 2020.

Republican primary

Candidates

Nominee
 Scott Franklin, Lakeland city commissioner

Eliminated in primary
 Ross Spano, incumbent U.S. representative

Declined
 Neil Combee, former state representative and candidate for Florida's 15th congressional district in 2018
 Danny Kushmer, non-profit executive and candidate for Florida's 15th congressional district in 2018 (Running for Florida House of Representatives, District 59)
 Sean Harper, contractor and candidate for Florida's 15th congressional district in 2018
 Ed Shoemaker, conservative activist and candidate for Florida's 15th congressional district in 2018 (Running for Polk County School Board)

Endorsements

Polling

Primary results

Democratic primary

Candidates

Nominee
 Alan Cohn, Peabody and Emmy award-winning journalist and nominee for Florida's 15th congressional district in 2014

Eliminated in primary
 Adam Hattersley, state representative
 Jesse Philippe, U.S. Marine Corps veteran

Withdrawn
 Kel Britvec, former Defense Intelligence Agency officer
 Andrew Learned, U.S. Naval Reserve officer and candidate for Florida's 15th congressional district in 2018 (Running for Florida House of Representatives, District 59)
 Loretta Miller, radio host and Republican candidate for Florida's 15th congressional district in 2018 (died on April 13, 2020)

Declined
 Kristen Carlson, attorney and nominee for Florida's 15th congressional district in 2018 (endorsed Adam Hattersley)

Endorsements

Primary results

General election

Predictions

Polling

Results

District 16

The 16th district encompasses the southern Tampa Bay area and southern Florida Suncoast, and includes all of Manatee County, as well as parts of Hillsborough and Sarasota counties. The district includes the cities of Sarasota, Bradenton, and Sun City Center. Republican Vern Buchanan, who has represented the district since 2007, was reelected with 54% of the vote in 2018.

This district was included on the list of Republican-held seats the Democratic Congressional Campaign Committee targeted in 2020.

Republican primary

Candidates

Nominee
 Vern Buchanan, incumbent U.S. representative

Democratic primary

Candidates

Nominee
 Margaret Good, state representative

Endorsements

General election

Predictions

Polling

with Generic Republican and Generic Democrat

Results

District 17

The 17th district encompasses part of Southwest Florida and most of the Florida Heartland, and includes all or part of 10 counties. The district includes the cities of North Port, Port Charlotte, and Sebring. Republican Greg Steube, who has represented the district since 2019, was elected with 62% of the vote in 2018.

Republican primary

Candidates

Nominee
Greg Steube, incumbent U.S. Representative

Democratic primary

Candidates

Nominee
Allen Ellison, nominee for Florida's 17th congressional district in 2018

Independent and third-party candidates

Independents

Declared 

 Theodore Murray, former high school football coach

General election

Predictions

Results

District 18

The 18th district encompasses the Treasure Coast region, and includes all of St. Lucie and Martin counties, as well as part of Palm Beach County. The district includes the cities of Port St. Lucie, Fort Pierce, and Jupiter. Republican Brian Mast, who has represented the district since 2017, was re-elected with 54% of the vote in 2018.

This district was included on the list of Republican-held seats the Democratic Congressional Campaign Committee targeted in 2020.

Republican primary

Candidates

Nominee
Brian Mast, incumbent U.S. Representative

Eliminated in primary
Nick Vessio, retired police sergeant

Primary results

Democratic primary

Candidates

Nominee
Pam Keith, attorney and candidate for Florida's 18th congressional district in 2018 and U.S. Senate in 2016

Eliminated in primary
Oz Vazquez, former Florida deputy solicitor general

Endorsements

Primary results

Independent and third-party candidates

Independents

Declared
 K. W. Miller, international energy and infrastructure executive

General election

Predictions

Polling

Results

District 19

The 19th district includes most of Southwest Florida, and includes parts of Lee and Collier counties. The district includes the cities of Cape Coral, Fort Myers, Estero, Bonita Springs and Naples. Republican Francis Rooney, who has represented the district since 2017, was reelected with 62% of the vote in 2018. On October 19, 2019, Rooney announced he would not seek re-election.

Republican primary

Candidates

Nominee
Byron Donalds, state representative

Eliminated in primary
Darren Aquino, disabilities activist and actor
 Casey Askar, businessman and U.S. Marine Corps veteran
Dane Eagle, majority leader of the Florida House of Representatives
William Figlesthaler, urologist
Randy Henderson, mayor of Fort Myers
Daniel Kowal, Collier County Sheriff's deputy
Christy McLaughlin, activist
Dan Severson, former Minnesota state representative and nominee for Minnesota Secretary of State in 2014

Withdrawn
 Heather Fitzenhagen, state representative

Declined
Gary Aubuchon, former state representative (endorsed Eagle)
Lizbeth Benacquisto, state senator
Matt Caldwell, former state representative (endorsed Eagle)
Chauncey Goss, son of former U.S. representative Porter Goss and candidate for Florida's 19th congressional district in 2016
Brian Hamman, Lee County commissioner
Matt Hudson, former state representative
Steve Martin, attorney
Jim Oberweis, Illinois state senator and nominee for U.S. Senate in Illinois in 2014 (Running for IL-14)
Kathleen Passidomo, state senator
Cecil Pendergrass, Lee County commissioner
Spencer Roach, state representative (endorsed Eagle)
Bob Rommel, state representative
Francis Rooney, incumbent U.S. representative
Mike Scott, former Lee County sheriff
Drew Steele, local Fox News Radio host

Endorsements

Polling

Primary results

Democratic primary

Candidates

Nominee
 Cindy Banyai, political science professor at Florida Gulf Coast University

Eliminated in primary
 David Holden, financial advisor and nominee for Florida's 19th congressional district in 2018

Endorsements

Primary results

Independent and third-party candidates

Independents

Declared 

 Patrick Post (write-in), president of Sustainable Planet USA

Withdrawn 

 Antonio Dumornay, housing activist

General election

Predictions

Results

District 20

The 20th district is located in South Florida, and includes parts of Broward and Palm Beach counties. The district includes the cities of Fort Lauderdale, Pompano Beach, and Belle Glade. Democrat Alcee Hastings, who has represented the district since 1993, was re-elected unopposed in 2018.

Democratic primary

Candidates

Nominee
 Alcee Hastings, incumbent U.S. representative

Eliminated in primary
 Sheila Cherfilus-McCormick, attorney and candidate for Florida's 20th congressional district in 2018

Withdrawn
 Roshan Mody, co-founder of Plus1 Vote
 Emmanuel Morel, former federal investigator for the U.S. Department of Labor and candidate for Florida's 21st congressional district in 2014

Primary results

Republican primary

Candidates

Declared
Vic DeGrammont, realtor
 Greg Musselwhite, welding inspector

Primary results

General election

Predictions

Results

District 21

The 21st district is located in South Florida, and includes part of Palm Beach County. The district includes the cities of West Palm Beach, Boynton Beach, and Wellington. Democrat Lois Frankel, who has represented the district since 2013, was re-elected unopposed in 2018.

Democratic primary

Candidates

Nominee
 Lois Frankel, incumbent U.S. representative

Eliminated in primary
 Guido Weiss, former advisor to U.S. Representative Tulsi Gabbard

Withdrawn
Adam Aarons, film producer and actor

Endorsements

Primary results

Republican primary

Candidates

Nominee
 Laura Loomer, reporter for InfoWars and far-right activist

Eliminated in primary
 Christian Acosta, nuclear engineer and Palm Beach State College professor
 Elizabeth Felton, animal rights activist
 Aaron Scanlan, U.S. Air Force veteran
 Reba Sherrill, health activist
 Michael Vilardi, retired Internal Revenue Service agent

Disqualified
 Michael Bluemling Jr., U.S. Army veteran
Victor Garcia da Rosa, businessman

Endorsements

Polling

Primary results

Independent and third-party candidates

Independents

Declared 

 Sylvia Caravetta (write-in), activist
 Charleston Malkemus, technology executive and U.S. Marine Corps veteran

Independent Republicans

Declared 

 Piotr Blass (write-in), former professor and perennial candidate

General election

Predictions

Polling

Results

District 22

The 22nd district is located in South Florida, and includes parts of Broward and Palm Beach counties. The district includes the cities of Boca Raton, Deerfield Beach, and Coral Springs. Democrat Ted Deutch, who has represented the district since 2010, was re-elected with 62% of the vote in 2018.

Democratic primary

Candidates

Nominee
Ted Deutch, incumbent U.S Representative

Republican primary

Candidates

Nominee
 James Pruden, attorney

Eliminated in primary
 Fran Flynn, businesswoman
 Jessi Melton, president of Paragon Wireless Group
 Darlene Swaffar, insurance agent

Endorsements

Primary results

General election

Predictions

Results

District 23

The 23rd district is located in South Florida, and includes parts of Broward and Miami-Dade counties. The district includes the cities of Pembroke Pines, Davie, and Aventura. Democrat Debbie Wasserman Schultz, who has represented the district since 2005, was re-elected with 58% of the vote in 2018.

Democratic primary

Candidates

Nominee
Debbie Wasserman Schultz, incumbent U.S. representative

Eliminated in primary
Jen Perelman, attorney

Endorsements

Primary results

Republican primary

Candidates

Nominee
 Carla Spalding, nurse, independent candidate for Florida's 18th congressional district in 2016, and candidate for Florida's 23rd congressional district in 2018

Eliminated in primary
 Michael Kroske, businessman

Withdrew
Richard Mendelson, former teacher at Marjory Stoneman Douglas High School

Primary results

Independent and third-party candidates

Independent Republicans

Declared 

 D. B. Fugate (write-in), entrepreneur and U.S. Air Force veteran
 Jeff Olson (write-in), real estate agent

General election

Predictions

Results

District 24

The 24th district is located in South Florida, and includes parts of Broward and Miami-Dade counties. The district includes the cities of Miami, Miami Gardens, and Hollywood. Democrat Frederica Wilson, who has represented the district since 2011, was re-elected unopposed in 2018.

Democratic primary

Candidates

Nominee
 Frederica Wilson, incumbent U.S Representative

Eliminated in primary
 Ricardo de La Fuente, perennial candidate and son of Rocky De La Fuente
 Sakinah Lehtola, progressive activist

Endorsements

Primary results

Republican primary

Candidates

Nominee
Lavern Spicer, nonprofit executive

Independent and third-party candidates

Libertarians

Withdrawn 
 Courtney Omega-Turner, Coconut Grove village councilwoman

Independent Republicans

Declared 

 Howard Knepper (write-in), businessman and candidate for U.S. Senate in 2010, 2016, and 2018

Independents

Declared 
 Hector Rivera (write-in), real estate broker
 Christine Alexandria Olivo, activist

General election

Predictions

Results

District 25

The 25th district is located in South Florida and stretches into parts of Southwest Florida and the Florida Heartland, and includes all of Hendry County, as well as parts of Miami-Dade and Collier counties. The district includes the cities of Hialeah, Doral, and Clewiston. Republican Mario Díaz-Balart, who has represented the district since 2003, was re-elected with 60% of the vote in 2018.

Republican primary

Candidates

Nominee
Mario Díaz-Balart, incumbent U.S. representative

Democratic primary

Candidates

Disqualified
Yadira Escobar, blogger

General election

Predictions

Results

District 26

The 26th district is located in South Florida and the Florida Keys, and includes all of Monroe County and part of Miami-Dade County. The district includes the cities of Homestead, Kendale Lakes, and Key West. Democrat Debbie Mucarsel-Powell, who has represented the district since 2019, flipped the district and was elected with 50% of the vote in 2018.

This district was included on the list of Democratic-held seats the National Republican Congressional Committee targeted in 2020.

Democratic primary

Candidates

Nominee
 Debbie Mucarsel-Powell, incumbent U.S. representative

Republican primary

Candidates

Nominee
 Carlos A. Giménez, Mayor of Miami-Dade County

Eliminated in primary
 Omar Blanco, former president of the Metro-Dade Firefighters Local 1403

Withdrew
José Peixoto, engineer and candidate for Florida's 26th congressional district in 2012 and 2016
Irina Vilariño, restaurateur

Declined
Carlos Curbelo, former U.S. Representative
Louis Sola, Federal Maritime Commissioner and candidate for Florida's 24th congressional district in 2018

Endorsements

Polling

Primary results

Endorsements

General election

Predictions

Polling

Results

District 27

The 27th district is located in South Florida, and includes part of Miami-Dade County. The district includes the cities of Coral Gables, Kendall, and Miami Beach, as well as the neighborhood of Little Havana in Miami. Democrat Donna Shalala, who had represented the district since 2019, flipped the district and was elected with 51% of the vote in 2018.

This district was included on the list of Democratic-held seats the National Republican Congressional Committee targeted in 2020.

Democratic primary

Candidates

Nominee
Donna Shalala, incumbent U.S. representative

Withdrawn
Michael Hepburn, University of Miami academic adviser

Endorsements

Republican primary

Candidates

Nominee
Maria Elvira Salazar, journalist and nominee for Florida's 27th congressional district in 2018

Eliminated in primary
 Juan Fiol, real estate agent
 Raymond Molina, banker and Brigade 2506 veteran

Endorsements

Primary results

Independent and third-party candidates

Independent Republicans

Declared 

 Frank Polo (write-in), businessman

General election

Predictions

Polling

Results

See also
 Florida elections, 2020
 Elections in Florida
 Politics of Florida
 Political party strength in Florida
 Florida Democratic Party
 Republican Party of Florida
 Government of Florida

Notes

Partisan clients

References

External links

Candidate links
Official campaign websites for 1st district candidates
 Phil Ehr (D) for Congress
 Matt Gaetz (R) for Congress

Official campaign websites for 2nd district candidates
 Neal Dunn (R) for Congress

Official campaign websites for 3rd district candidates
 Kat Cammack (R) for Congress
 Adam Christensen (D) for Congress

Official campaign websites for 4th district candidates
 Donna Deegan (D) for Congress 
 John Rutherford (R) for Congress

Official campaign websites for 5th district candidates
 Gary Adler (R) for Congress
 Al Lawson (D) for Congress

Official campaign websites for 6th district candidates
 Clint Curtis (D) for Congress
 Alan Grayson (D) for Congress
 Gerry Nolan (I) for Congress
 Michael Waltz (R) for Congress

Official campaign websites for 7th district candidates
 William Garlington (I) for Congress
 Stephanie Murphy (D) for Congress
 Leo Valentin (R) for Congress

Official campaign websites for 8th district candidates
 Jim Kennedy (D) for Congress 
 Bill Posey (R) for Congress

Official campaign websites for 9th district candidates
 Bill Olson (R) for Congress
 John Christian Rallison (I) for Congress
 Darren Soto (D) for Congress

Official campaign websites for 10th district candidates
 Val Demings (D) for Congress
 Vennia Francois (R) for Congress
 Kristofer Lawson (I) for Congress 

Official campaign websites for 11th district candidates
 Dana Cottrell (D) for Congress 
 Daniel Webster (R) for Congress

Official campaign websites for 12th district candidates
 Gus Bilirakis (R) for Congress
 Michael Knezevich (I) for Congress
 Kimberly Walker (D) for Congress

Official campaign websites for 13th district candidates
 Charlie Crist (D) for Congress
 Anna Paulina Luna (R) for Congress

Official campaign websites for 14th district candidates
 Kathy Castor (D) for Congress
 Christine Quinn (R) for Congress 
 Robert Wunderlich Sr. (I) for Congress 

Official campaign websites for 15th district candidates
 Alan Cohn (D) for Congress 
 Scott Franklin (R) for Congress

Official campaign websites for 16th district candidates
 Vern Buchanan (R) for Congress
 Margaret Good (D) for Congress

Official campaign websites for 17th district candidates
 Allen Ellison (D) for Congress
 Greg Steube (R) for Congress

Official campaign websites for 18th district candidates
 Pam Keith (D) for Congress 
 Brian Mast (R) for Congress
 KW Miller (I) for Congress 

Official campaign websites for 19th district candidates
 Cindy Banyai (D) for Congress
 Byron Donalds (R) for Congress
 Antonio Dumornay (I) for Congress 

Official campaign websites for 20th district candidates
 Alcee Hastings (D) for Congress
 Greg Musselwhite (R) for Congress

Official campaign websites for 21st district candidates
 Lois Frankel (D) for Congress
 Laura Loomer (R) for Congress
 Charleston Malkemus (I) for Congress

Official campaign websites for 22nd district candidates
 Ted Deutch (D) for Congress
 James Pruden (R) for Congress

Official campaign websites for 23rd district candidates
 Carla Spalding (R) for Congress
 Debbie Wasserman Schultz (D) for Congress

Official campaign websites for 24th district candidates
 Lavern Spicer (R) for Congress
 Frederica Wilson (D) for Congress

Official campaign websites for 25th district candidates
 Mario Díaz-Balart (R) for Congress

Official campaign websites for 26th district candidates
 Carlos A. Giménez (R) for Congress
 Debbie Mucarsel-Powell (D) for Congress

Official campaign websites for 27th district candidates
 Maria Elvira Salazar (R) for Congress
 Donna Shalala (D) for Congress

Florida
2020
United States House of Representatives